This List of Florida State Seminoles men's golfers includes notable athletes who played for the Florida State Seminoles men's golf team that represents Florida State University in Tallahassee, Florida, and who play or have played golf professionally. These Florida State University alumni played on the PGA Tour and/or on the affiliated Korn Ferry Tour or Champions Tour. The table lists their wins on these tours and other notable golfing achievements.

Lists of male golfers
Florida State Seminoles men's golf
Florida State Seminoles golfers